Sir George Peter Labouchere  (London, 2 December 1905 – Dudmaston Hall, Shropshire, 14 June 1999) was a British diplomat and collector of modern art.

Career
Labouchere was educated at Charterhouse School and the Sorbonne, and entered the Diplomatic Service in 1929.

He was Deputy-Commissioner for Austria, 1951–53, Minister to Hungary 1953–55, Ambassador to Belgium 1955–60, and Ambassador to Spain 1960–66. He was a member of the Society of Dilettanti and was associated at various stages with the Tate Gallery, London, serving as president of the Friends of the Tate. He was an avid art collector, buying, at various stages, works by British artists including Henry Moore, Barbara Hepworth, Lynn Chadwick and Ben Nicholson.  He also bought contemporary continental works, including Victor Vasarely, Antoni Tàpies, Pierre Soulages, Jean Dubuffet and Max Ernst.

Family
Labouchere was a descendant of an old Huguenot merchant family exiled in the 17th century to England, which included prominent politicians such as Henry Labouchere, 1st Baron Taunton and Henry Du Pré Labouchere. His father was Lieutenant-Colonel Francis Anthony Labouchere, a banker and reserve officer, and his mother was Evelyn Stirling, only child of Sir Walter Stirling, 3rd Baronet of Faskine.

His sister Lilah married Ailwyn Fellowes, 3rd Baron de Ramsey, a first cousin (once removed) of Winston Churchill.

On 10 May 1943 he married Rachel Hamilton-Russell, granddaughter of the 8th Viscount Boyne. Dudmaston Hall, now run by the National Trust, was Rachel Hamilton-Russell's ancestral home, inherited from her maternal uncle Geoffrey Wolryche-Whitmore, and the couple settled there to restore it in their retirement. He was president of the Shropshire branch of the Council for the Protection of Rural England.

Honours
Labouchere was appointed  in the New Year Honours of 1951, knighted KCMG in 1955 and given the additional, senior knighthood of GBE in 1964.

References

1905 births
1999 deaths
People educated at Charterhouse School
University of Paris alumni
English art collectors
Knights Commander of the Order of St Michael and St George
Knights Grand Cross of the Order of the British Empire
Ambassadors of the United Kingdom to Spain
Ambassadors of the United Kingdom to Belgium
Ambassadors of the United Kingdom to Hungary